Johanna Catharina "Tineke" Huizinga-Heringa (born 16 February 1960) is a Dutch politician of the Christian Union (CU) party.

Huizinga grew up in Amersfoort; both of her parents were teachers. After attending gymnasium, she began to study law at the University of Utrecht. She became involved in the Christian student's association Ichtus, where she met her future husband. They married in 1982. After passing her candidate exams (roughly equivalent of a bachelor's degree), she stopped her studies and moved to Heerenveen. She became a housewife and mother of three children.

She volunteered as translator at a Christian foundation, Open Doors, which advocates the interest of persecuted Christians worldwide. She became involved in the cases of asylum seekers and refugees and worked as a volunteer for VluchtenlingenWerk Nederland. Because of her involvement with social and religious issues, the Reformatory Political Federation asked her to become their top candidate in Heerenveen for the 1998 municipal elections. She was elected into the Heerenveen municipal council.

In 2002 she was elected member of House of Representatives. She was elected on basis of preference votes. The ChristianUnion only got four seats and she was seventh candidate, but because so many voters voted for her she entered parliament at the cost of prominent GPV leader Eimert van Middelkoop. She was member of the parliamentary research committee into the Srebrenica massacre. In the 2003 elections she was re-elected, again with preference votes, now at the cost of Leen van Dijke. She was fourth candidate and the ChristianUnion only got three seats. In parliament she had been occupied with foreign affairs, international development, migration, integration, spatial planning and the environment. She was secretary of the parliamentary party.

As Secretary of State for Transport, Public Works and Water Management, Huizinga survived a motion of no confidence in April 2008 over the (supposedly failed) introduction of a MIFARE-based nationwide public transport payment system.

Decorations

References

External links

Official
  J.C. (Tineke) Huizinga-Heringa Parlement & Politiek

 
 

1960 births
Living people
Christian Union (Netherlands) politicians
Dutch corporate directors
Dutch humanitarians
Women humanitarians
Dutch nonprofit directors
Dutch nonprofit executives
Members of the House of Representatives (Netherlands)
Ministers of Housing and Spatial Planning of the Netherlands
Municipal councillors in Friesland
Netherlands Reformed Churches Christians from the Netherlands
Officers of the Order of Orange-Nassau
People from Amersfoort
People from Dantumadiel
People from Heerenveen
Reformatory Political Federation politicians
State Secretaries for Transport of the Netherlands
Utrecht University alumni
Women government ministers of the Netherlands
20th-century Dutch women politicians
20th-century Dutch politicians
21st-century Dutch businesspeople
21st-century Dutch women politicians
21st-century Dutch politicians